Denis Gennadyevich Churkin (born 30 July 1979) is a former Russian professional football player.

Club career
He played in the Russian Football National League for FC Spartak Chelyabinsk in 2005.

References

External links
 

1979 births
Living people
Russian footballers
Association football forwards
FC Zvezda Irkutsk players
FC Sakhalin Yuzhno-Sakhalinsk players
FC Orenburg players
FC Spartak Nizhny Novgorod players